The 4 Hours of Portimão (also known as 4 Hours of Algarve) is an endurance race for sports cars, held at Autódromo Internacional do Algarve, in Portugal. The first races were held in 2009 and 2010 as 1000 Kilometres of Algarve, as part of Le Mans Series calendar. Since 2017, it is run in 4 hours format, as part of the European Le Mans Series.

History 
The 1000 Kilometres of Algarve was run for the first time in 2009, and was the third round of the Le Mans Series. The race was won by Pescarolo Sport, whilst Quifel ASM Team won the LMP2 category, Alphand Aventures won the GT1 category, and JMW Motorsport won the GT2 category. The race was held again in 2010, and again was the third round of the Le Mans Series. This time, Team Oreca Matmut took the overall victory, whilst RML won the LMP2 category, DAMS won the Formula Le Mans category, AF Corse won the GT2 category, and Larbre Competition won the GT1 category. For 2011, the Portuguese round of the Le Mans Series used the Autódromo do Estoril instead, and the 1000 km of Algarve hasn't been run since.

In 2017 Portimão took the place of Estoril in the European Le Mans series calendar, in a 4 hour race.

Winners

References

European Le Mans Series races
2009 establishments in Portugal